Rejah Sara (also Romanized as Rejah Sarā; also known as Rejā Sar) is a village in Rahimabad Rural District, Rahimabad District, Rudsar County, Gilan Province, Iran. At the 2006 census, its population was 100, in 24 families.

References 

Populated places in Rudsar County